Yosel Tiefenbrun (born in Brooklyn, New York) also known as Rabbitailor, is an American tailor and rabbi, based in Williamsburg, Brooklyn. He is best known for being a Savile Row-trained bespoke tailor. Tiefenbrun has been awarded Best in Show at the Golden Shears Award Ceremony.

Early life
Tiefenbrun was born in Brooklyn and raised in London. He comes from a long line of tailors, fabric merchants, and artists. Tiefenbrun studied design at Nanyang Academy of Fine Arts, Singapore in 2011 while interning at Harper's Bazaar magazine. He also studied and graduated from the Savile Row Academy, London, in 2014, and apprenticed under Master Tailor Andrew Ramroop of Maurice Sedwell for two years.

Career
After finishing his apprenticeship, Yosel moved back to Singapore and worked as a tailor at Kevin Seah Bespoke, where he worked with many Asian and international clients. While in Singapore he also worked as a Rabbi for the Singapore Jewish Community, where he led a congregation of over 200 expatriates. At the age of 28, Yosel moved to New York to open his own tailoring house, TIEFENBRUN, in Williamsburg, New York. He was featured in Time Out London, Fortune Magazine, GQ, the New York Times, the Times of Israel, TabletMag, and Haaretz. Tiefenbrun suits have been featured on the TV show Madam Secretary.

Personal life
Tiefenbrun married his wife Chaya in 2014 and they have two children.

References

Year of birth missing (living people)
Living people
American rabbis
American tailors
People from Brooklyn
21st-century American Jews